The twelfth season of the American television series Whose Line Is It Anyway? premiered on The CW on May 23, 2016, and concluded on September 28, 2016.

Cast

Recurring 
 Wayne Brady (18 episodes)
 Jeff Davis (seven episodes)
 Jonathan Mangum (five episodes)
 Brad Sherwood (four episodes)
 Gary Anthony Williams (three episodes)
 Keegan-Michael Key (one episode)
 Greg Proops (one episode)

Episodes 

"Winner(s)" of each episode as chosen by host Aisha Tyler are highlighted in italics. The winner(s) perform a sketch during the credit roll, just like in the original UK series.

References

External links
Whose Line Is It Anyway? (U.S.) (a Titles & Air Dates Guide)
Mark's guide to Whose Line is it Anyway? - Episode Guide

Whose Line Is It Anyway?
2016 American television seasons